Rohan Janse van Rensburg (born 11 September 1994) is a South African professional rugby union player for South African United Rugby Championship side the Sharks. His regular position is inside centre.

Career

Youth
He was also called into the South African Schools squad in 2012.

Senior career
He then started five of their remaining six matches in this competition.

2016 season
The 2016 Super Rugby season was the breakthrough for Janse van Rensburg. At inside centre, he had a very successful partnership with fellow centre, Springbok Lionel Mapoe. Janse van Rensburg managed to score 10 tries in 17 games;which is very prolific for a number 12. The Golden Lions managed to make the 2016 Super Rugby final but lost to the Hurricanes 20-3.

Sale Sharks
Janse van Rensburg made eight appearances for English Premiership side  in the 2017–18 English Premiership during a loan spell in 2018, before returning on a permanent deal before the 2018–19 season.

He was fined £32,500 and handed a two-week suspension in April 2020 for breaching protocol having been contracted to two teams. Sale Sharks were also found to have breached rules about the way they approached him.

Representative rugby
Janse van Rensburg was included in the S.A. Schools squad in 2012 and the South Africa Under-20 squad for the 2013 and 2014 IRB Junior World Championship tournaments.

Springboks
Janse van Rensburg first represented Springboks XV in a non-cap friendly vs Barbarians XV in which he scored a last-gasp try to secure a 31-31 draw. He was later included in the Springboks squad for their 2016 Outgoing series of Europe. He started the final game of the tour vs Wales at inside centre where the Springboks lost.

References

1994 births
Living people
Afrikaner people
Blue Bulls players
Rugby union centres
Rugby union players from Welkom
South Africa international rugby union players
South Africa Under-20 international rugby union players
South African rugby union players
Golden Lions players
Lions (United Rugby Championship) players
Sale Sharks players
Sharks (rugby union) players